The Tijuco River (Portuguese, Rio Tijuco) is a river of Minas Gerais state in southeastern Brazil. It is a tributary of the Paranaíba River, which it joins in the reservoir created by São Simão Dam.

See also
 Tributaries of the Río de la Plata

References

 Map from Ministry of Transport
 Rand McNally, The New International Atlas, 1993.

Rivers of Minas Gerais